Licheng may refer to the following locations:
Licheng County, of Changzhi, Shanxi
Licheng District, Jinan, Shandong
Licheng District, Putian, Fujian
Licheng District, Quanzhou, Fujian
Licheng Subdistrict, Xianyou County, Fujian
Licheng Subdistrict, Guangzhou, subdivision of Zengcheng District, Guangzhou, Guangdong
Licheng, Guangxi, town in and subdivision of Lipu County, Guangxi
Licheng, Jinhu County, town in and subdivision of Jinhu County, Jiangsu
Licheng, Liyang, town in and subdivision of Liyang, Jiangsu